Jelkung is a possible Afro-Asiatic language spoken in south central Chad.

Ethnologue 18 lists Jelkung as a synonym of Saba, in a different branch of East Chadic.

Notes 

East Chadic languages
Languages of Chad